A seder (plural: sedarim) is part of a biblical book in the Masoretic Text of the Hebrew Bible.

In the Torah
The text of the Torah is divided into roughly 150 sedarim though sources disagree on the exact number. Differing texts record 141, 154 or 167 sedarim.

The division of the Torah into sedarim is a result of the ancient custom of a triennial cycle for Torah reading. The Babylonian Talmud states that it was the custom of Jews in Israel to read the Torah in a three-year cycle.

In other parts of the Bible
The books of Nevi'im and Ketuvim are also divided into sedarim. Unlike the parashot (another subdivision of the biblical books in the Masoretic Text that is indicated by various spacing techniques), which are thematic divisions of the text, the divisions indicated by the sedarim is mostly quantitative. In Tiberian masoretic manuscripts, it is noted in the margin.
In this part there are 293 sedarim, which are the numbers of weekdays during the year, some people read that 293 Sedarim in addition to the parashah and complete the whole Bible every year.

Modern use
The sedarim are seldom used in modern times. The Babylonian tradition of completing the Torah in an annual cycle became the dominant tradition, and eventually the Palestinian reading cycle ceased to be used altogether. This made the sedarim liturgically obsolete.

Additionally, the use of the chapter divisions of the Bible has made the sedarim unnecessary as structural divisions in the text.

Today few editions of the Bible mark the sedarim. The Biblia Hebraica Stuttgartensia note them in the margin, and the Koren Tanakh ascribes to them ascending Hebrew numerals.

Other use
In its sense as part of cyclical public reading of a biblical book, the term is also used to designate the Weekly Torah portion. In this sense it is often called sidra (plural sidrot) from the same root.

References

Hebrew Bible
Jews and Judaism in Palestine (region)
Torah reading